Hassan Ashjari, born 18 February 1979 in Fuman, is an Iranian football player.

Club career
He starts his professional career with his hometown team Malavan at 2001 in Iran Pro League and played 4 seasons in the team. Malavan was relegated to Azadegan League in 2003 and Ashjari had a great performance for Malavan and scored many goals and help the club to promote to Pro League once again.
In 2005, he was transferred to Zob Ahan FC. His excellent performances made him to win the Team Melli shirt and was one of the key players for Zob Ahan in 2008–09 and 2009–10 seasons. He joined Still Azin in 2010 and stayed there for a season before joining Sepahan in 2011. He won the league in his first season with Sepahan. However, in the middle of the following season, due to what he described as personal problems, Ashjari decided to leave Sepahan.  Despite rumours which stated Malavan as his next club, Ashjari joined Esteghlal on 5 December 2012. At the end of the season, he was transferred to Malavan, the club which he started his professional career there.

Club career statistics
Last Update: 10 May 2013 

Assists

International career
He was a member of national team for a short period of time between 2008 and 2010. He played in 2010 FIFA World Cup qualification and 2011 AFC Asian Cup qualification for Team Melli and had been a regular Player. but after leaving Zob Ahan in 2010 he could not make it to national team anymore.

Honours

Club
Zob Ahan
Iran Pro League: 2008–09 (Runner-up), 2009–10 (Runner-up)
Hazfi Cup: 2008–09

Sepahan
Iran Pro League: 2011–12

Esteghlal
Iran Pro League: 2012–13

References

External links

1979 births
Living people
Iranian footballers
Sepahan S.C. footballers
Zob Ahan Esfahan F.C. players
Malavan players
Steel Azin F.C. players
Iran international footballers
Esteghlal F.C. players
Persian Gulf Pro League players
Association football defenders